Agrochola pulchella is a species of cutworm or dart moth in the family Noctuidae.

The MONA or Hodges number for Agrochola pulchella is 9955.

References

Further reading

 
 
 

Agrochola
Articles created by Qbugbot
Moths described in 1900